William James Wilson (21 November 1891 – 9 February 1957) was an Australian rules footballer who played with Fitzroy in the Victorian Football League (VFL).

Notes

External links 

Billy Wilson's playing statistics from The VFA Project

1891 births
1957 deaths
Australian rules footballers from Melbourne
Fitzroy Football Club players
People from Brunswick, Victoria